Philip Mark Quast  (born 30 July 1957) is an Australian actor and singer. He has won the Laurence Olivier Award for Best Actor in a Musical three times, making him the first actor to have three wins in that category.

He is perhaps best known for his role as Inspector Javert in the stage musical Les Misérables and in the Les Misérables: The Dream Cast in Concert.

He is also well-known for numerous other theatre roles, notable ones being George Banks in Mary Poppins, Judge Turpin, Georges Seurat/George, and The Wolf/Cinderella's Prince in Stephen Sondheim's Sweeney Todd: The Demon Barber of Fleet Street, Sunday in the Park with George, and Into the Woods, Georges in La Cage aux Folles, and Emile de Becque in Rodgers and Hammerstein's South Pacific. 

He is also known for appearances in film and for his roles in television shows such as Ultraviolet, Brides of Christ, and Play School.

Early life and education 
Quast, one of three children, was born in 1957 in Tamworth, New South Wales. His family lived and worked on a mixed but predominantly turkey farm.  He graduated from the National Institute of Dramatic Art in 1979.

Acting career

1980s
After graduating from the National Institute of Dramatic Art in 1979 and began his career in the resident acting company of the State Theatre Company of South Australia. In the early 1980s he appeared in plays such as The Mystery Plays of Wakefield, Three Sisters, On The Wallaby, Pericles, A Month in the Country, As You Like It, Pygmalion, A Hard God, No End of Blame, The Threepenny Opera,  Shark Infested Waters, Candide with Nimrod Theatre Company, and a musical adaption of Carmen which he debuted with the Melbourne Theatre Company.

In 1981, Quast also began appearing as a presenter on the Australian children's show Play School, a program he would return to on-and-off again for 17 years. 

Quast shot to prominence in 1987 when he appeared as Javert in the original Australian production of Les Misérables. This performance won him a Sydney Critic Award and a MO Award. In 1989, he traveled to London to play Javert on the West End stage.

Quast never expected to gain such a prominent role, going to the auditions hoping simply for a place in the chorus. Because he was not able to sight-read music, he walked off the stage at the audition but was called back by Claude-Michel Schönberg and eventually given the part as Javert.

Quast credits much of his success as Javert to stage director Trevor Nunn. "Javert for me is not the Wicked Witch of the West," Quast has said. "In fact, there is very little material to work with in the script. Trevor would say things in passing like 'Have you read the Ten Commandments recently?' That's all he would say. If you're thirsty enough, you can follow it up ... there was the whole basis of our legal system and the explanation for the whole of Les Mis. For me, that's inspired directing. That's why he's such an awesome man."

When playing Javert, Quast gained a reputation as a perfectionist. He also began experiencing intense bouts of stagefright. "I had a terrible time," he said. "It took me a month to get over it. At one stage I wasn't sleeping at all but lying awake planning speeches to the audience about being sorry and could I start again."

1990s
Quast's stage success continued as he won the coveted role of Georges Seurat in the original London production of Stephen Sondheim's Sunday in the Park with George for the Royal National Theatre.

In 1991 he won his first Laurence Olivier Award for Best Actor in a Musical as Georges Seurat and George. Quast was under a large amount of stress when preparing for Sunday in the Park with George, as he struggled to master Sondheim's complicated musical scores (Sondheim told him:  "you don't play tennis against people you can beat."), learn to paint and sketch for the play, and waited for the impending birth of his first son, who was due five days after opening night.

In 1993 he returned to Australia to play in Sydney Theatre Company productions of William Shakespeare's Coriolanus and Sondheim's Into the Woods, in which he played The Wolf/Cinderella's Prince.  He then played Dunois in Bernard Shaw's Saint Joan in the West End and on a UK tour in 1994. In 1994–96 he spent two seasons with the Royal Shakespeare Company, performing as Fred/Chorus in A Christmas Carol, and King of Navarre in Shakespeare's Love's Labour's Lost, as well as Lodovico in The White Devil, Banquo in Macbeth, and Achilles in Troilus and Cressida. Before returning for a second season with the RSC, he spent some time back in Australia, performing in the national tour of The Secret Garden as Dr. Neville Craven – along with Anthony Warlow and Marina Prior.

2000s

Musical theatre
Quast played the part of Javert on the Les Misérables Complete Symphonic Recording, and in Hey, Mr. Producer, a concert in honour of Sir Cameron Mackintosh. 

Though mainly a baritone, Quast has played some roles written for tenors, namely George (see above), Candide, and Archibald Craven in The Secret Garden. Although he is known for his serious roles, he has also performed comedic parts, such as his 2004 appearance as the pompous Miles Gloriosus in a limited run revival of A Funny Thing Happened on the Way to the Forum at the Royal National Theatre.

Quast more recently played the supporting role of Juan Peron in Andrew Lloyd Webber's 2006 production of Evita at the Adelphi Theatre in London. He was nominated for an Olivier award for this role. In July 2007, Quast performed the role of Judge Turpin in a concert version of Sweeney Todd at London's Royal Festival Hall.

He was most recently in the Menier Chocolate Factory production of Jerry Herman's La Cage aux Folles as Georges.

Quast rejoined the cast of La Cage on 4 May 2009 with Roger Allam. Coincidentally, both actors have performed in the role of Javert in Les Misérables. From July 2010, he played Mr. Banks in the Australian premiere production of Mary Poppins at Melbourne's Her Majesty's Theatre, a part Cameron Mackintosh offered to him in the bathroom of The Ivy in London. He won the 2010 Victorian Green Room Award (Melbourne's top theatre awards) for Best Supporting Actor in a Musical for his performance. He also won the 2011 Helpmann award for "Best Featured Actor in a Musical" for Mary Poppins.

In March 2014, New York audiences were treated to a special limited engagement of Sweeney Todd at Lincoln Center's Avery Fisher Hall. Quast, in his New York stage debut, performed as Judge Turpin, with Bryn Terfel as Sweeney Todd and Emma Thompson as Mrs. Lovett. The show was scheduled to be broadcast as part of Live at Lincoln Center's television special in September 2014.

Theatre

In 2003, he appeared as Antonio in Shakespeare's The Merchant of Venice, directed by Gale Edwards and as Trigorin in Chekhov's The Seagull, directed by Steven Pimlott, both at the Chichester Festival Theatre. In 2012, he played the role of Sir Humphrey Appleby in an Australian production of Yes, Prime Minister. In August/September 2012, he performed the role of Walter Burns in Melbourne Theatre Company's production of His Girl Friday. In November 2013 he joined Hugo Weaving and Richard Roxburgh in Sydney Theatre Company's production of Samuel Beckett's Waiting For Godot. In May/June 2014, Quast played the role of Pastor Manders in Henrik Ibsen's play Ghosts at the Melbourne Theatre Company directed by Gale Edwards.

Theatre

Personal life
Quast and his wife Carol have three sons (Edwin, Harry and Toby). He also teaches at the National Institute of Dramatic Art in Sydney, Australia. During the COVID-19 pandemic, Quast continued teaching through Zoom calls.

Quast married Carol in 1981 and they were married for almost ten years before having the first of their three sons. He has been noted for his humble nature, stating he doesn't seek after fame and is concerned that success is measured by notoriety instead of the respect of one's peers. He doesn't keep any of his awards, instead sending them to his parents' home in Australia.

Quast was named as one of the 25 Most Beautiful People for 1996 in Who Weekly magazine. In an article for the magazine he said, "The problem with this business is that you have to supposedly look as good as you can all the time. And I hate that. My idea of doing my hair is sticking it out of the window of a car when it's wet."

A baritone, Quast has been universally applauded by critics for his singing voice, which has been described as "warm", and "glorious."
 He was named by British newspaper The Stage as "one of the most notable singing actors to come along in years".

Quast has a strong passion for fishing, and he spent his time during the COVID-19 pandemic fishing, cooking, pickling and preserving.

Awards

Laurence Olivier Awards
Quast has won three Laurence Olivier Awards for Best Actor in a Leading Role in a Musical, behind only Judi Dench and Ian McKellen.
 1991 – for Stephen Sondheim's Sunday in the Park with George in the role of Georges Seurat and George
 1998 – for the Dempsey and Rowe musical The Fix as Grahame Chandler
 2002 – for Rodgers and Hammerstein's South Pacific in which he played Emille de Becque

Mo Awards
The Australian Entertainment Mo Awards (commonly known informally as the Mo Awards), were annual Australian entertainment industry awards. They recognise achievements in live entertainment in Australia from 1975 to 2016. Philip Quast won three awards in that time.
 (wins only)
|-
| 1988
| Philip Quast
| Male Musical Theatre Performer of the Year
| 
|-
|rowspan="2"|  1993 
| Philip Quast
| Male Musical Theatre Performer of the Year
| 
|-
| Philip Quast
| Musical Theatre Performer of the Year
| 
|-

Other awards
 2022 – Appointed Member of the Order of Australia in the 2022 Queen's Birthday Honours for "significant service to the arts as a performer, mentor and educator".
 2011 – Helpmann Awards – Best Actor in a Supporting Role in a Musical (Mary Poppins) 
 2011 – Green Room Awards – Male Artist in a Featured Role (Mary Poppins) 
 1993 – Sydney Theatre Critics Award – Best Actor in a Leading Role (Into the Woods) 
 1988 – Sydney Theatre Critics Award: Best Actor of the Year (Les Misérables)

Cast recordings
Philip Quast has appeared in the cast recordings for many musicals, but has also released his own album, Live at the Donmar, containing both covers and original material.

Musical cast recordings:

 Mary Poppins - Original Australian Cast Recording (2011) 
 Evita – London Cast Recording (2006) 
 The Secret Garden – Original London Cast Recording (2001)
 South Pacific (Royal National Theatre Production – 2001 London Cast)
 The Fix – Original London Cast Recording (1997) 
 Les Misérables: The Dream Cast in Concert (1995) 
 The Secret Garden – Original Australian Cast Recording (1995)
 Paris – Studio Cast Recording (1990)
 Les Misérables: The Complete Symphonic Recording (1989)

Film and television
Quast has also made numerous appearances on television, in motion pictures and in dramatic theatre. Major roles include:
 Between Two Worlds (2020) (TV) – Phillip Walford
 Operation Buffalo (2020) (TV) – Prof Quentin Ratchett
 Picnic at Hanging Rock (2018) (TV) – Arthur Appleyard
 Hacksaw Ridge (2016) – Judge
 Janet King (2016) (TV) – Lincoln Priest
 Miss Fisher's Murder Mysteries (2015) (TV) – Dr. Hayden Samuels
 The Devil's Double (2011) – Saddam Hussein
 Bed of Roses (2008) - (TV) - Tim Price
 Silent Witness (2008) (TV) – Leonid Polyak
 Clubland (2007)
 The Caterpillar Wish (2006) – Carl Roberts
 Midsomer Murders – Ghosts of Christmas Past – (2004) – Ross Villiers
 Corridors of Power (2001) (TV) – Michael Fielding MP
 Ultraviolet (1998) (TV) – Father Pearse Harman
 The Damnation of Harvey McHugh (ABC-TV; 1995) – The Minister
 Brides of Christ (ABC-TV mini-series; 1991) – Ian McGregor 
 The First Kangaroos (1988) – Alex Burdon
 To Market To Market (1987)
 Emoh Ruo (1985)
 Sons and Daughters (Grundy Television Production) – Bob "Mitch" Mitchell (TV; 1984)
 The Young Doctors (Grundy Television Production) – Dr Rob Hawkins (TV; 1982–83)
 Play School (1981–96)

References

External links
 
 The Philip Quast Continuum: The Official Philip Quast Website
 The Philip Quast Guide
 Winners of the Laurence Olivier Award

1957 births
Australian male television actors
Australian male stage actors
Australian male musical theatre actors
Australian bass-baritones
Helpmann Award winners
Living people
Australian operatic baritones
Laurence Olivier Award winners
Members of the Order of Australia
National Institute of Dramatic Art alumni
Australian expatriates in the United Kingdom
People from Tamworth, New South Wales
Australian children's television presenters
20th-century Australian male singers
20th-century Australian male actors